Santino Michael Ferrucci (born May 31, 1998) is an American professional racing driver. He competes in the IndyCar Series, driving the No 14 Chevrolet for A.J. Foyt Racing. He has also previously raced in the FIA Formula 2 Championship.

Career

Lower formulae

He competed in five races in German Formula Three for EuroInternational, scoring 2nd in his fourth. He also completed three races in British Formula 3 for Fortec Motorsport, scoring a pole and two wins as well as the end of European Formula 3 season, again for EuroInternational.

Reuniting with Fortec, Ferrucci participated in the Macau Grand Prix. Ferrucci finished the main race in 8th.

FIA Formula 3 European Championship
At the start of the year, Ferrucci competed in the Toyota Racing Series for Giles Motorsport. Ferrucci finished the season 3rd overall, scoring his only win at Manfeild and scoring 5 other podiums.

Ferrucci returned to European Formula 3, this time with Mücke Motorsport, finishing 11th overall and scoring his only podium in Formula 3 at Spa.
At the end of the year, Ferrucci once again raced in the Macau Grand Prix, this time finishing 6th in the main race.

GP3 Series
Ferrucci moved to the GP3 Series with newcomers DAMS. Ferrucci's best result was a 3rd in the sprint race at Spa-Francorchamps and ended the season 12th in the standings.

In February 2017, Ferrucci retained a DAMS drive for a second GP3 season. He only competed in the first three events, and scored points in only the first two races, before making a switch to Formula 2.

FIA Formula 2 Championship
Ferrucci made his Formula 2 debut in Hungary and finished the remainder of the year with Trident, with ninth his best result for a race and 22nd in the season standings.
For the 2018 season Ferrucci remained in Formula 2 for 2018, competing alongside Arjun Maini at Trident.

In July, Ferrucci was banned from four F2 races (Hungary and Belgium) after making deliberate contact with his teammate Maini after the Sprint Race at Silverstone on the weekend of the British Grand Prix. He was also disqualified from the Sprint Race results at Silverstone for a separate incident when he deliberately forced Maini off the track. He was also found to have driven his car between the F2 and F1 paddock without one glove and while holding his phone, which resulted in a €6,000 fine.

On July 18, Ferrucci was summarily fired by the Trident F2 team, citing behavioral issues, and non-payment of money required by contract. Trident alleged that money had been made available for the Detroit IndyCar race, whilst noting that Ferrucci had defaulted on F2 debt to them. An Italian court subsequently ordered Ferrucci to pay Trident €502,000, plus interest and legal fees, for failing to make payments. Six days later, Trident announced that their GP3 Series driver Alessio Lorandi would be his replacement for the rest of the season.

Ferrucci finished 19th in the standings, with seven points and a best result of sixth in the Baku Sprint race.

Formula One

After confirmation of Ferrucci's entry into the 2016 GP3 Series, he became a test and reserve driver for the Haas F1 Team alongside Ferrari Driver Academy member and GP3 champion, Charles Leclerc. Ferrucci got his first taste of F1 machinery when he tested for Haas at Silverstone after the British Grand Prix. Haas retained Ferrucci as development driver for 2017 and 2018.

IndyCar Series

2018 
In June 2018, Ferrucci made his debut in the IndyCar Series at the Detroit Grand Prix for Dale Coyne Racing as a substitute for Pietro Fittipaldi. Ferrucci retired from his first race after colliding with Charlie Kimball on lap 56.

After his departure from Formula 2, Ferrucci contested the final two rounds of the IndyCar Series season with Dale Coyne Racing.

2019 
Ferrucci signed with Coyne to contest the full 2019 IndyCar Series season driving the No. 19 Cly-Del Honda. In his season debut at the Grand Prix of St. Petersburg, Ferrucci recorded a Top-10 finish, bringing his car home in 9th position. At the Indianapolis Grand Prix, he posted his second Top-10 finish of the IndyCar season heading into preparations for his first Indianapolis 500 effort. After qualifying 23rd for the Indy 500, Ferrucci moved through the 33 car field to finish in 7th position, earning him Rookie of the Year honors in his first-ever race at the Indianapolis 500. Three races later, Ferrucci recorded his best career IndyCar finish by taking the checkered flag in 4th position at Texas Motor Speedway.

2020 
After teammate Sébastien Bourdais's departure from Dale Coyne Racing, Ferrucci moved to Bourdais's No. 18 SealMaster Honda for the 2020 season. He finished 4th at the Indianapolis 500, and scored five top 5s out of 14 races, to finish 13th in points.

2021 
Ferrucci signed with Rahal Letterman Lanigan Racing to run a third car sponsored by Hyvee at the 2021 Indianapolis 500. Ferucci drove the car to sixth place, the highest of any of the RLL drivers in the race. Ferrucci's results at the Indy 500 earned him four additional drives with RLL at Detroit, Mid Ohio, and Nashville. Ferrucci recorded top-ten finishes at both races in Detroit as well as Mid Ohio but also crashed the #45 car in such a manner that the team could not fix it in time for the second Detroit race, forcing him to run with a car that used what was still drivable off of #45 car and Takuma Sato's backup/superspeedway car. Ferrucci expressed to Bobby Rahal that he would be open to a full-time return to IndyCar if Rahal were to give him a drive in the third RLL car. RLL ultimately chose Alpine Academy driver Christian Lundgaard to drive their third car full time, ending Ferrucci's tenure with the team.

2022 

Ferrucci signed with Dreyer & Reinbold Racing to compete in the 2022 Indianapolis 500 alongside Sage Karam. However, he would also fill in for Jack Harvey at Rahal Letterman Lanigan Racing for the XPEL 375, as Harvey withdrew after qualifying due to a crash declaring him not fit to race.

After Callum Ilott crashed during the 2022 Indianapolis 500 and was deemed not fit by Indycar, Ferrucci has been appointed as his replacement at the Detroit Grand Prix.

2023 
Ferrucci will return to IndyCar in 2023 full-time with A.J. Foyt Racing, partnering Indy Lights graduate Benjamin Pedersen. It will be his first full Indycar campaign since 2020.

Midget car racing

In January 2021, Ferrucci made his midget car racing debut in the Chili Bowl for Dave Mac Motorsports. He failed to finish his G Feature race and was classified in tenth.

NASCAR
On January 8, 2021, it was confirmed that Ferrucci would run a 20-race schedule piloting the No. 26 Toyota Supra for Sam Hunt Racing for the upcoming NASCAR Xfinity Series season. Ferrucci had limited stock car racing experience prior to NASCAR, with his lone foray being a super late model test with Fury Race Cars in 2020. Ferrucci would return to the team's No. 26 car for the Xfinity Series races at Pocono and the Indianapolis Road Course in 2022.

Personal life
Ferrucci was born in Woodbury, Connecticut, to Mike and Valerie Ferrucci. Growing up, his racing idol was Michael Schumacher.

Controversy
In 2018, Ferrucci was deemed guilty of having deliberately used his vehicle as a weapon, intentionally colliding into fellow driver Arjun Maini in the aftermath of the Silverstone Formula 2 sprint race, subsequently having no-showed at the steward's post-race hearing when called to account before penalized a two-race ban by the International Motor Sport Federation governing body, the FIA. Following the race, his team Trident Racing released a series of tweets criticizing the behavior of Ferrucci and his father Michael towards Maini. Ferrucci was accused of racism in the abuse of racially-charged epithets directed toward Maini, insulting his Indian heritage. Ferrucci  attempted a publicity stunt which violated international sporting code, attempting to compete for the purpose of a provocative, politically charged livery including the slogan "TRUMP -- Make America Great Again" in the two Silverstone races, but was refused permission by race officials, as advertising that is political in nature is banned under the International Sporting Code. He was later fired from Trident due to sponsorship complications.

Karting record

Karting career summary

Racing record

Career summary

† As Ferrucci was a guest driver, he was ineligible to score championship points.
* Season still in progress.

Complete FIA Formula 3 European Championship results 
(key) (Races in bold indicate pole position) (Races in italics indicate fastest lap)

Complete Toyota Racing Series results 
(key) (Races in bold indicate pole position) (Races in italics indicate fastest lap)

Complete GP3 Series results
(key) (Races in bold indicate pole position) (Races in italics indicate fastest lap)

† Driver did not finish the race but was classified as he completed over 90% of the race distance.

Complete FIA Formula 2 Championship results
(key) (Races in bold indicate pole position) (Races in italics indicate points for the fastest lap of top ten finishers)

† Driver did not finish the race but was classified as he completed over 90% of the race distance.

American open-wheel racing results
(key) (Races in bold indicate pole position) (Races in italics indicate fastest lap)

IndyCar Series
(key)

Indianapolis 500

NASCAR
(key) (Bold – Pole position awarded by qualifying time. Italics – Pole position earned by points standings or practice time. * – Most laps led.)

Xfinity Series

 Season still in progress

References

External links
 
 
 

1998 births
Living people
Racing drivers from Connecticut
American people of Italian descent
British Formula Three Championship drivers
FIA Formula 3 European Championship drivers
German Formula Three Championship drivers
Karting World Championship drivers
People from Woodbury, Connecticut
Toyota Racing Series drivers
American GP3 Series drivers
FIA Formula 2 Championship drivers
IndyCar Series drivers
Indianapolis 500 drivers
Indianapolis 500 Rookies of the Year
Auto racing controversies
EuroInternational drivers
Fortec Motorsport drivers
Mücke Motorsport drivers
DAMS drivers
Trident Racing drivers
Dale Coyne Racing drivers
Rahal Letterman Lanigan Racing drivers
Juncos Hollinger Racing drivers
Dreyer & Reinbold Racing drivers
A. J. Foyt Enterprises drivers